Cheviot may refer to:

Places
The Cheviot, the highest summit in the Cheviot Hills, United Kingdom
Cheviot, Victoria, Australia
Cheviot, New Zealand in North Canterbury
Cheviot (New Zealand electorate), a parliamentary electorate in the Canterbury region of New Zealand
Cheviot, Ohio, United States

Other
Cheviot goat, a landrace population of goats in Northern England
Cheviot sheep, a breed of sheep originally from the borders of England and Scotland
Cheviot (cloth), a type of tweed, made originally from the wool of the Cheviot sheep
HMS Cheviot (R90), a C-class destroyer of the British Royal Navy launched in 1944
SS Cheviot, an English steamer ship of the late 19th century

See also
Cheviot Hills (disambiguation)
Cheviot Beach, a beach in Victoria, Australia
Cheviot Lake, a lake in Saskatchewan, Canada
Cheviot Mountain, a summit in Alberta, Canada